Jean-Marc Monnerville (born 21 February 1959), better known by his stage name Kali, is a French musician from Martinique known for his contributions to Modern Zouk, banjo playing and his work with the Eurovision Song Contest. He is further notable for his often controversial, politically charged lyrics comment on imperialism, slavery and military proliferation.

Early life
Monnerville was born in Fort-de-France on 21 February 1956. His mother, a primary school teacher, and his father, a professional musician, encouraged Jean-Marc to study classical percussion. The nickname "Kali" was developed in primary school in homage to "Kalimero," a well-known cartoon character of the time. Kali's musical career began in earnest when his father sent him to France in the early 1970s to study music composition and theory. His first group, "Gaoule" was symbolically named after a notorious slave massacre carried out in the French West Indies in the 17th century. 

His signature Rasta style developed in 1979 with his sophomore ensemble, 6ème Continent. Their notable singles included an iconoclastic version of "Adieu Foulards" and "Reggae Dom-Tom", a hard-hitting song which evoked the difficult relationship between France and its former colony. In June 1983, 6ème Continent rose to national prominence when they stepped in to replace the Nigerian singer Femi Kuti at the "Fète de la Musique." Playing on an open-air stage erected on the Place du Trocadéro, 6ème Continent proved an enormous hit. After being asked to "modernize their sound" by CBS Records (the international name of Columbia Records), Monnerville made the executive decision to split up the group.

Developing career
Kali returned to Martinique to start a solo career, intentionally ignoring the popular "Zouk" craze and focusing on traditional music of the West Indies. This return to musical heritage was further explored on the albums "Racines I" (1989) and "Racines II" (1990) by fusing acoustic piano and banjo with percussion and synthesizers.
After returning to Paris for a live performance in 1990, he was selected to represent France in the 1992 Eurovision Song Contest. His performance, the original composition Monté la riviè (Going up the River) was regarded by fellow contestants to be "an absolute surprise" for its offbeat subject matter and inclusion of the banjo. While the French entry ranked 8th among 22, his performance garnered major popularity and helped the sales of his next album "Lese la Te Tounen" (Let the Earth Move). In 1994 he won an award from the Sacem (French Association of Songwriters and Composers), citing his composition "Pan Patchew" as "Best Song of 1994."

Recent Music
His 1995 album "Débranché" (Unplugged), reverts to a purely acoustic sound. Following the record's success, Kali was invited to perform in Zimbabwe where he joined other musicians celebrating the Centenary of the first anti-colonial insurrection. "Racines IV," a 1998 album, celebrated the artist's comeback to traditional West Indian music since 1992.
In 2002, Kali commemorated the centenary of the eruption of the Pelée volcano with "Bèlè Boum Bap."
The fifth album in the "Racines Caraïbes" series was released in November 2007, featuring guest performances by Jocelyne Beroard, Tanya Saint-Val, Emeline Michel and Ralph Thamar.

Discography
As Gaoulé:

As 6eme Continent:

As Kali:

References

External links
Eurovision Song Contest Today Unofficial Page
 

1956 births
Living people
People from Fort-de-France
Martiniquais musicians
French pop singers
Eurovision Song Contest entrants for France
Eurovision Song Contest entrants of 1992
French people of Martiniquais descent